Jakub Novák may refer to:
Jakub Novák (Slovak cyclist), born 1988
Jakub Novák (Czech cyclist), born 1990